Sagadahoc refers to more than one geographic feature of the U.S.:

 Sagadahoc County, Maine
 Sagadahoc Bridge, Maine
 An archaic name for the Kennebec River in Maine
 Territory of Sagadahock